Sammudi Balasubramaniam known as Bala, was an athlete from Tamil Nadu who specialises in long jump and triple jump. He was the second Indian to secure a bronze medal in triple jump in Asian Games.He touched this landmark at the 1982 Asian Games held at New Delhi, India with a performance of 16.14 m in his last attempt.

Balasubraminam died in 2016 following injuries from a fall while on pilgrimage to Sabarimala. He is survived by his wife and two sons — Vinod and Pradeep, both of whom are athletics students with the Sports Authority of India.

References 

Year of birth uncertain
1960s births
2016 deaths
Indian male long jumpers
Indian male triple jumpers
Asian Games bronze medalists for India
Athletes (track and field) at the 1982 Asian Games
Asian Games medalists in athletics (track and field)
Athletes from Tamil Nadu
Tamil sportspeople
Medalists at the 1982 Asian Games